Nitrosyl fluoride (NOF) is a covalently bonded nitrosyl compound.

Reactions
NOF is a highly reactive fluorinating agent that converts many metals to their fluorides, releasing nitric oxide in the process:

n NOF + M → MFn + n NO

NOF also fluorinates fluorides to form adducts that have a salt-like character, such as NOBF4.

Aqueous solutions of NOF are powerful solvents for metals, by a mechanism similar to that seen in aqua regia.  Nitrosyl fluoride reacts with water to form nitrous acid, which then forms nitric acid:

NOF + H2O → HNO2 + HF

3 HNO2 → HNO3 + 2 NO + H2O

Nitrosyl fluoride can also convert alcohols to nitrites:

ROH + NOF → RONO + HF

It has a bent molecular shape: this can be rationalized in the VSEPR model in terms of the lone-pair of electrons located on the N atom.

Uses
Nitrosyl fluoride is used as a solvent and as a fluorinating and nitrating agent in organic synthesis.  It has also been proposed as an oxidizer in rocket propellants.

References

External links
 WebBook page for NOF
 National Pollutant Inventory - Fluoride and compounds fact sheet

Nitrosyl compounds
Oxyfluorides
Fluorinating agents
Nitrogen(III) compounds
Nitrogen oxohalides